Miyun District is situated in northeast Beijing. Miyun District government seat is located in Gulou Subdistrict.

History 
Miyun was one of the places where Warlord Feng Yuxiang stationed his troops in preparation of the Beijing Coup of 1924.
In the 1930s, Miyun District was occupied by the Imperial Japanese Army and became part of the area controlled by the East Hebei Autonomous Council, a puppet state of Japan. The Japanese occupation was challenged, however, when a local Taoist priest managed to incite Miyun's peasantry. As member of the Yellow Sand Society, he garnered followers and convinced them that they could become immune to gunfire through magical rituals that he performed. Thus highly motivated, the peasants launched a rebellion in July 1936 and defeated an East Hopei Army unit that was sent to suppress them. Nearby Imperial Japanese Army forces were consequently mobilized against the insurgents. By September, the uprising was defeated and about 300 of Miyun's Yellow Sand rebels had been killed or wounded in the fighting.

Administrative divisions

There are 2 subdistricts, 17 towns, 1 township which carry the "area" label in the district, as well as an additional economic development area. The government seat of Miyun District is located in Gulou Subdistrict.

Geography
Miyun contains the easternmost point of Beijing Municipality, bordering the Beijing districts of Pinggu to the southeast, Shunyi to the southwest and Huairou to the west as well as Hebei province to the due north and east. The Miyun Reservoir, a major source of water for the Beijing Municipality is also located in Miyun District.

Climate

Tourism
A popular tourist attraction in Miyun district is Simatai, a section of the Great Wall. Another is Nanshan Ski Resort, one of the largest in the country.

Transportation

Beijing–Shenyang high-speed railway: Miyun railway station.
Beijing–Chengde railway: Miyun North railway station.

Education

See also

References

Bibliography

External links

 Official website of Miyun Government (Chinese)
 Illustrated Atlas of Shanhai, Yongping, Jizhou, Miyun, Gubeikou, Huanghua Zhen and Other Areas

 
Districts of Beijing
Cancelled cities
Tourism in China